The Minster Church of St Michael and All Angels and St Benedict Biscop (commonly known as Sunderland Minster) is the minster church of Sunderland, Tyne and Wear, England. Formerly known as "St Michael & All Angels' Church", it served as the parish church for Bishopwearmouth, but was renamed in January 1998 after Sunderland was granted city status. In May 2007 the Minster ceased to be the parish church of Bishopwearmouth and village is now a suburb of Sunderland. Sunderland Minster is part of the Greater Churches Group.

History
A church dedicated to St Michael & All Angels has stood on this site for over a thousand years. For most of that time, it has been known as ‘Bishopwearmouth Parish Church’. 
The parish of Bishopwearmouth, south of the River Wear was founded in around 940AD, with an original stone church being built shortly afterwards. The first evidence of a church on the site arose in a 1930s excavation when Saxon stones were found. Due to colliery subsidence, the church was virtually re-built beyond recognition in the early 20th century, but not all parts of the former church were lost.

In 1998, following the grant of City status, the church was redesignated as ‘Sunderland Minster’: the second Minster church in England since the Reformation (following Dewsbury Minster in West Yorkshire in 1994).

In May 2007, with the adoption of Benedict Biscop as Sunderland's Patron Saint, the church was redesignated as an Extra Parochial Place with the addition of St Benedict Biscop in its title.

It is a Grade II* listed building.

Role of the Minster
Until May 2007 the team of ministers carried out traditional parish duties as well as serving the city by hosting services of remembrance, providing chaplaincies for the retail and industrial workforces in the city centre, as well as being used by the University chaplaincy. It continues to play host to special services and worship events for the whole city, as it did for many years as Bishopwearmouth Parish Church. In 2007 the Minster ended its parish role, and these functions were transferred to the Parish Churches of St Nicholas and St Ignatius. Since then the Minster describes itself as "A church for the whole City".

See also
Holy Trinity Church, Sunderland
Bishopwearmouth Rectory

References

External links
 Sunderland Minster Website

Church of England church buildings in Tyne and Wear
Churches in the City of Sunderland
Grade II* listed churches in Tyne and Wear
Major Churches Network
Sunderland